The 1970–71 DDR-Oberliga was the 22nd season of the DDR-Oberliga, the first tier of league football in East Germany.

The league was contested by fourteen teams. Dynamo Dresden won the championship, the club's second of eight East German championships, having previously won the 1952–53 edition.

Hans-Jürgen Kreische of Dynamo Dresden was the league's top scorer with 17 goals, the first of a record four top scorer finishes for Kreische, while Peter Ducke of FC Carl Zeiss Jena won the seasons East German Footballer of the year award.

On the strength of the 1970–71 title Dresden qualified for the 1971–72 European Cup where the club was knocked out by Ajax in the first round. Ninth-placed club BFC Dynamo qualified for the 1971–72 European Cup Winners' Cup as the seasons FDGB-Pokal runners-up, Dresden having won the double, and was knocked out by Dynamo Moscow in the semi-finals. Second-placed FC Carl Zeiss Jena qualified for the 1971–72 UEFA Cup where it was knocked out in the third round by Wolverhampton Wanderers while third-placed Hallescher FC Chemie withdrew after losing a player in the Hotel 't Silveren Seepaerd fire before the second leg of their first round tie with PSV Eindhoven.

At the end of the season National People's Army club FC Vorwärts Berlin, based in East Berlin, was moved to Frankfurt/Oder to become FC Vorwärts Frankfurt/Oder for political reasons. Vorwärts had been quite a popular club with East Berlin football supporters but was seen as an obstacle to the ambitions of BFC Dynamo, which was supported by the Ministry for State Security and its head Erich Mielke. The relocation was allegedly driven by Erich Mielke, who wanted to create better sporting conditions for BFC Dynamo in East Berlin, and his fellow Politburo member and SED First Secretary in Bezirk Frankfurt Erich Mückenberger, who anticipated a boost for the Frankfurt/Oder region.

Table									
The 1970–71 season saw two newly promoted clubs 1. FC Union Berlin and 1. FC Lokomotive Leipzig.

Results

References

Sources

External links
 Das Deutsche Fussball Archiv  Historic German league tables

1
1970-71
Ober